Bülent Kocabey  (born June 8, 1984 in Istanbul, Turkey), is a Turkish footballer who plays as a midfielder for Edirnespor.

External links
 Profile at TFF.org 
 Profile at futbolig.com.tr 

1984 births
Living people
Turkish footballers
Süper Lig players
Gençlerbirliği S.K. footballers
Eskişehirspor footballers
Hacettepe S.K. footballers
Kardemir Karabükspor footballers
Karşıyaka S.K. footballers
Adanaspor footballers
TFF First League players
Association football midfielders